The Marsh Family are an English family musical group. The group consists of parents Ben and Danielle Marsh and their children Alfie, Thomas, Ella, and Tess Marsh. The family live in Faversham, a town in Kent in South East England.

The Marsh Family uploaded a parody of "One Day More" to Facebook on 29 March 2020, satirising life during COVID-19 lockdowns. The video went viral, reaching over seven million views in three days. It led to the family's earning international news coverage and appearing on ITV's This Morning and BBC Breakfast. During the COVID-19 pandemic, the family parodied numerous songs to describe their experiences. After the group's parody of "Total Eclipse of the Heart" went viral in February 2021, Isabella Kwai wrote in The New York Times, "This six-voice choir, with its sweet harmonies and the occasional wobbly note, is creating songs that dramatize the mundane moments of lockdown life, from too much screen time to the horrors of remote learning." With input from his family, Ben Marsh is the songwriter for most of the group's parodies.

History

Early history
The Marsh Family comprises parents Ben and Danielle Marsh and their children Alfie, Thomas, Ella, and Tess Marsh, who live in Faversham, a town in Kent in South East England. Ben and Danielle Marsh met while attending the University of Cambridge. At university shows, they performed as vocalists. They did a duet for "Don't Go Breaking My Heart", and Ben performed in the musical Anything Goes after Danielle had completed her studies. Danielle said in an interview, "We were in a strange relationship for most of our time at university; I knew that I wanted to spend my dotage with Ben, but it took him a while to realise it. So, we were friends, but not in a relationship until a while after we both left."

The family uploaded videos made in 2018 and 2019 of covers. The Arkansas Democrat-Gazettes Celia Storey said of the performances that the family "display youthful talent in all its hit-or-miss but heartwarming exuberance". They made covers of the A Star Is Born song "Shallow", the Avenue Q song "It Sucks to Be Me", and The Greatest Showman song "From Now On". In their From Now On cover, the kids sing and perform their instruments while wincing as Monty, their dog, is howling along.

Viral video: parody of "One Day More"
Beginning in March 2020, the Marsh Family increased the number of videos they posted. During the COVID-19 pandemic, the family became well-known with their parody covers that satirised life during COVID-19 lockdowns. Uploaded to Facebook on 29 March 2020, their parody of "One Day More" from Les Misérables went viral, reaching over seven million views in three days. Their aim was to amuse family members who had recent birthdays but whom they were unable to see in person: Danielle's mother, Ben's sister, and Danielle and Ben's niece. The lyrics, which Ben wrote in one afternoon the previous week, were inspired by the disappointments they experienced during the lockdown in not being able to meet their friends, having soccer games called off, being far away from grandparents, and having grandparents unaware of how to get Skype to work. Neither of the brothers wanted to play the suitor, Marius Pontmercy, while performing a duet with his sister. Once Ben modified the lyrics including changing "I was born to be with you" to "I am bored of being with you", Thomas acceded to playing Marius' part.

After a few dinner table rehearsals, the group filmed themselves performing the song on the afternoon of 29 March and uploaded the video to Facebook shortly before 11pm. The video is taken in the living room which has photos of the family and a curtain with a floral pattern. Ella has on a dressing gown, and Thomas is wearing the previous year's Watford F.C. shirt. At the beginning of the video, siblings Thomas and Tess bicker: Thomas says Tess struck him, Tess responds that she touched him lightly, and Thomas rejoins that she has been doing this throughout the day. CBS News's Rose Manister said the sibling fight reflects the difficulty of being together all the time during the COVID-19 pandemic lockdown. The parents used pizza to convince the children to sing, and they completed the video in two takes with the video camera filming the entire process, including the bickering. The children sing, "Watch our daddy drink, see our mummy sigh, clapping for the NHS can make 'em cry." The viral video led to the family's receiving international news coverage and appearing on several television stations.

The children "belt out the song and really commit" with NPR calling the rendition "a delight" and The Daily Telegraph calling it "highly infectious". USA Todays Carly Mallenbaum wrote, "the harmonies and overlapping verses by all family members are extremely impressive". The Mary Sues Kaila Hale-Stern wrote, "what makes this video really pop is the incredible vocalizing and dedication from all of the Marsh family members, down to the youngest child, who takes on the vocally challenging part usually sung by Eponine in the show". Noting that Alfie, the older son, brandishes a red jacket in parallel to the musical's rebellious Enjolras as he wields a red banner, Hale-Stern called the scene "brilliant staging". The Marsh Family were interviewed on ITV's This Morning by Phillip Schofield and Holly Willoughby on 30 March 2020 and on BBC Breakfast by Louise Minchin and Dan Walker on 31 March 2020.

Adaptation of songs during the COVID-19 pandemic

During the COVID-19 pandemic, the family released many parodies of songs. They created their YouTube channel on 14 April 2020. Using a recording device they acquired during Christmas, the group performed a cover of the song "Under Pressure" without changing the lyrics as they felt it was appropriate for the pandemic. Moved by Black Lives Matter's overturning a slave trader's statue in Bristol, they created their own version of "Amazing Grace". To commemorate the safe completion of the children's grandfather's surgery in 2020, Ben Marsh composed the original piece "The Prostectomy Song". With "cheeky lyrics", the song included the verses, "With no prostate,//You can celebrate//You can contemplate,//You can weeeee!" Danielle Marsh's father, John Burn, had received a prostate cancer diagnosis in 2018. In "The Buy-in Eats Tonight", a February 2020 adaptation of "The Lion Sleeps Tonight", Thomas performed on the clarinet while Ella made "bat frequency high ahhs". The song reflects on how the family has become accustomed during the COVID-19 lockdown to ordering takeaway. Their May 2020 parody of Moanas "Where You Are" includes pessimistic commentary: "You'll be OK./If not you'll learn just to hide it./You must find happiness right where you are." "Have the New Jab", which parodies Leonard Cohen's "Hallelujah", contains "pointy humor" in its lyrics:Maybe there's a plan above to implant things into our blood

But why on earth would Bill Gates want to rule ya?

And it's not a trick to get you spayed! It's not some change to our DNA!

It's a Covid-fighting weapon! Have the new jab.Released in January 2021, the video features Ella and Tess Marsh and their father, Ben Marsh, and encourages people who are vaccine hesitant to take the COVID-19 vaccine. The song received applause from medical workers with Sarah Dickens, who heads research at Kent and Medway NHS and Social Care Partnership Trust, saying, "Well this may be the best thing I ever saw." Nadhim Zahawi, the Parliamentary Under-Secretary of State for COVID-19 Vaccine Deployment, praised the song, tweeting, "That has to be it! That has to be the theme tune for this national vaccination drive. Well done the Marsh family." "Test Monkey", a parody of "Dance Monkey", stars an orangutan puppet and bemoans the outages on a website for scheduling COVID-19 tests. "Somewhere (There's No Place for You)", which satirises West Side Storys "Somewhere (There's a Place for Us)". The performance features the orangutan who bickers with Ella and Tess Marsh, telling them they must be apart, "there's no place for them", and they must not hold hands.

In February 2021, the March Family released a parody of Bonnie Tyler's "Total Eclipse of the Heart" titled "Totally Fixed Where We Are". After the adaptation received over two million YouTube views within a fortnight, Isabella Kwai of The New York Times profiled the group, writing, "This six-voice choir, with its sweet harmonies and the occasional wobbly note, is creating songs that dramatize the mundane moments of lockdown life, from too much screen time to the horrors of remote learning." Tyler, the song's original singer, praised the rendition, writing in a tweet, "Absolutely love this." Christy Somos of CTV News called the cover "an impassioned, tongue-in-cheek rendition", while The Independents Jenny Eclair found it "cleverly re-worded and timely". Alfie and Thomas Marsh harmonise that their increased consumption of food during the pandemic may have made their clothes becoming more close-fitting. Ella and Tess Marsh sing that they are unable to determine whether they have gotten taller. The music video includes an "interpretive angst dance" from two of the children while the parents and the other two children go on their smartphones. The family reprised their performance of "Totally Fixed Where We Are" on the 2021 edition of the BBC show Comic Relief. The family gave away money they made from performances to Save the Children and the World Health Organization's COVID-19 Solidarity Response Fund. The Marsh Family wrote a letter for Natasha Kaplinsky's 2021 book Letters from Lockdown in which they answered the question "What was lockdown like for you?"

They performed the songs "I Know Them Too Well", which parodies Chesss "I Know Him So Well"; "Ten School Commandments", which satirises Hamiltons "Ten Duel Commandments"; and "From a (Social) Distance", which parodies the Julie Gold song "From a Distance". The Marsh Family's rendition of "Freedom of Life", a parody of Sweet Charitys "Freedom of Life", received praise for being "catchy" and for showcasing Ben Marsh's baritone. Adapting Les Misérabless "Do You Hear the People Sing? to have an optimistic tone, in "From a (Social) Distance", the family conveyed the idea of a reopened world "When tomorrow comes". They parodied the musical's "One Day More" with the kids conversing with each other saying, "I am bored of being with you", "Do we get a change of clothes?" and "Have you seen my brother's hair?!" For their March 2021 song "Goodbye Pandemic Road", they parodied the Elton John song "Goodbye Yellow Brick Road". The Marsh Family released the song "Lockdown World", a parody of the Billy Joel song "Uptown Girl" ahead of the loosening of the lockdown restrictions on 19 July 2021. It included "clever lyrics", having "time" and "confined" rhyme as well as "vaccines" and "spike proteins" rhyme. In December 2021, they released "Mack the Knife (Prostate Cancer – Facts of Life)" to raise awareness about prostate cancer which Danielle Marsh's father had recovered from after surgery. Written by Ben Marsh, the song parodies the Bobby Darin song "Mack the Knife". Filmed at the Moth Club in Hackney, London, the music video showcases employees from Prostate Cancer UK and Danielle Marsh's parents, John and Linda Burn. The Marshes made the video to raise money for Prostate Cancer UK.

Members

 Ben Marsh (born in 1976), the father, is a history lecturer at the University of Kent who specialises in the colonial history of the United States. He received a history degree from the University of Cambridge's Downing College in 1995. Marsh authored the 2007 book Georgia's Frontier Women: Female Fortunes in a Southern Colony. Book reviewer Kent Anderson Leslie praised the book, calling it "an important text and sets a high standard of inclusive, insightful scholarship". Marsh wrote a second book, Unravelled Dreams: Silk and the Atlantic World, 1500-1840, in 2020. It received the Hagley Prize in Business History, which is organised by the Hagley Museum and Library and Business History Conference. Book reviewer Paul D Blanc penned a positive review of the book, stating that it "is valuable in its own right, but it also is worthy for the foundation it provides to reconsider more broadly the decolonial ecology of textiles". The historian Patricia Fara wrote that Marsh "skilfully converts entrepreneurial losses into scholarly gains, providing a much-needed counterbalance to triumphalist tales of innovative success and unsettling easy assumptions of inevitable technological progress".
 Danielle Marsh (born in 1977), the mother, is a university administrator. Her parents are John Burn, a professor and geneticist, and Linda Burn. She is a "Research Programmes Coordinator" in the Education & Student Experience division of the Kent Business School. She received a history degree from the University of Cambridge's Downing College in 1995 and has been a history instructor.
 Alfie Marsh (born in 2006)
 Thomas Marsh (born in )
 Ella Marsh (born in 2009)
 Tess Marsh (born in )

Although Ben and Danielle Marsh do not have a musical theatre background, Ben's parents teach music. Aside from their performances in school plays and musical instrument classes, the children have not received musical theatre instruction. Collectively they play the bass guitar, clarinet, cornet, drums, piano, and violin. The family has a dog, Monty, which appears in their music videos. They adopted a puppy, Boo, in 2021.

Artistry
Before the pandemic, the family had rewritten the lyrics of songs they had heard. Ben Marsh is the songwriter for nearly all of the family's adaptations. He makes an adaptation proposal and his children evaluate and can reject it which they did for satirising the song "Oklahoma" as "Oh Corona!" They purchased a laptop for audio mixing. Celia Storey wrote in the Arkansas Democrat-Gazette, "All the adaptations have clever lyrics and some have choreography." The Marsh Family were likened to The von Trapps and The Partridge Family.

Footnotes

References

External links
 Official website
 
 
 Marsh Family on Twitter: https://twitter.com/MarshSongs

2020 establishments in England
English YouTubers
Family musical groups
Musical groups from Kent
Musical groups established in 2020
Music YouTubers
People from Faversham
YouTube channels launched in 2020
English comedy musicians
Parody musicians
British parodists
English YouTube groups